was a Japanese speed skater who competed in the 1952 Winter Olympics. He finished seventh in the 10000 m and 15th in the 5000 m event.

References

External links

1927 births
1962 deaths
Japanese male speed skaters
Speed skaters at the 1952 Winter Olympics
Olympic speed skaters of Japan
Sportspeople from Hokkaido
People from Tomakomai, Hokkaido
20th-century Japanese people